Western Australia has considerable resources of uranium, but to date there has been no commercial mining in the state.

Mining proposals

Two uranium mining projects in the state are closer to production, the 750 tonne U3O8 Lake Maitland project, pursued by Mega Uranium, and the 680 tonne U3O8 Centipede–Lake Way project undertaken by Toro Energy, located at Lake Way.

Deposits
Major development projects include:
Yeelirrie, Wiluna (Cameco)
Kintyre, Telfer (Cameco and Mitsubishi Corp)
Mulga Rock, Pinjin (Vimy Resources)
Lake Way - Wiluna (Toro Energy)
Lake Maitland, Wiluna (Toro Energy)
Nyang, Learmonth (Paladin Energy)
Manyingee, Onslow (Paladin Energy)
Oobagooma, Derby (Marenica Energy)
Dawson Hinkler Well, Wiluna (Toro Energy)
Thatcher Soak (Marenica Energy)
Hillview, Meekatharra (Encounter)

Public opposition
There has been some opposition to uranium and nuclear industries in WA, especially since the 2011 Fukushima nuclear disaster, including anti-uranium campaigns from the Conservation Council of Western Australia, Nuclear-Free Alliance, and the Anti-Nuclear Alliance. In the past WA Greens leader Giz Watson and Labor MP Sally Talbot have spoken out against uranium mining, nuclear power and radioactive waste disposal in WA.

See also
List of uranium projects
Uranium mining in Australia
Anti-nuclear movement in Australia

Notes

Uranium mining in Western Australia